Aore  is a recently extinct Oceanic language spoken on Aore Island, just off Espiritu Santo Island in Vanuatu.

References

Languages of Vanuatu
Extinct languages of Oceania
Espiritu Santo languages